

Events
 William Kent is appointed to remodel Rousham House and gardens in Oxfordshire, England, "a landmark in the history of the Romantic movement."

Buildings and structures

Buildings

 Château de Bagnolet, Paris.
 San Simeone Piccolo on the Grand Canal (Venice), designed by Giovanni Antonio Scalfarotto, completed.
 Iglesia de Nuestra Señora de la Palma, Algeciras, Spain, designed by Alonso Barranco and completed by Isidro Casaus.
 Welsh Charity School, Clerkenwell, London, designed by James Steer.
 Residenz Ansbach reconstruction completed by Leopold Retti.

Publications
 Giovanni Niccolò Servandoni – Description abregée de l'eglise Saint Pierre de Rome (Paris)

Births
 Matvey Kazakov, Russian neoclassical architect (died 1812)
 Approximate date – John Palmer of Bath, English architect (died 1817)

Deaths
 January 20 – Francesco Galli Bibiena, Italian architect, designer and painter (born 1659)
 March 16 – George Bähr, German architect; designer of Protestant churches (born 1666)
 Date unknown – Francis Smith of Warwick, English architect (born 1672)

References

Architecture
Years in architecture
18th-century architecture